William Grymes Pettus (1794–1867) was a Missouri politician.

Biography
William Grymes Pettus was born in Mecklenburg County, Virginia on December 31, 1794. In 1818, he arrived in St. Louis, where he served in the War of 1812. While a land office clerk in St. Louis, he was elected secretary of the State Convention which wrote the Missouri Constitution when it was admitted into the United States in 1821.

His public service included Secretary of State in the Alexander McNair administration, Probate Judge of St. Louis County, and in 1832 he was elected a member of the Missouri Senate for the St. Charles District.

He married Caroline R. Morrison on December 31, 1826.

He died in St. Louis on December 25, 1867. He was buried at Bellefontaine Cemetery.

References

1794 births
1867 deaths
Secretaries of State of Missouri
Missouri state senators
19th-century American politicians
Burials at Bellefontaine Cemetery